Betty is a French psychological drama film directed by Claude Chabrol based on the novel of the same title by Georges Simenon.  It was first released in France in 1992.

Plot
Betty (Marie Trintignant), a young alcoholic woman, is caught cold while cheating on her bourgeois husband.  Wasting no time, he and his family arrange a quick divorce settlement, ousting her from home and keeping her away from the two children the couple have.  One night she ends up in a restaurant called Le Trou (The Hole), where she meets Laure (Stéphane Audran), an older woman, an alcoholic herself.  Laure decides to take care of Betty after hearing the heart-breaking stories of her being a victim of her husband's rich and ruthless high society family.  Betty receives care and friendship from Laure, who's in a relationship with Mario (Jean-Francois Garreaud), the restaurant's owner.  Betty's envy toward Laure, especially regarding her relationship with Mario, grows each day and eventually drives Betty to contrive the means to conquer her new friend's lover.  Laure realizes she has made a mistake by trusting Betty, and things soon begin to fall apart between them.  Betty's true colors are now visible and she sees her life at a point of no return, as she has selfishly stomped on the last chance she had of being a better person.

Cast
 Marie Trintignant - Betty Etamble
 Stéphane Audran - Laure
 Jean-François Garreaud - Mario
 Yves Lambrecht - Guy Etamble
 Christiane Minazzoli - Madame Etamble
 Pierre Vernier - Le médecin
  - Frédéric
 Thomas Chabrol - Schwartz
 Yves Verhoeven - Philippe

Reception
Journalist Lawrence O'Toole from Entertainment Weekly defined Marie Trintignant's performance as "smashing," but overall rated the film a B+.  In the Chicago Sun Times Roger Ebert described the film as a story of intertwined surprises, a film that doesn't have a plot per se.  The story is a chain reaction of events as this is the story of a woman who keeps tripping over her own faults and reckless behavior.  Megan Rosenfeld, staff writer at The Washington Post, found Marie Trintignant's performance a tad empty aside from the contribution she gives to the movie through her beauty.) John Simon of the National Review in addition to praising the acting of Trintignant and Audran said "Betty is one of the most well-behavedly bone-chilling horror stories of all time".

References

External links 
 

1990s French-language films
1990s psychological drama films
French psychological drama films
Films directed by Claude Chabrol
Films based on works by Georges Simenon
Films based on Belgian novels
1992 drama films
1992 films
1990s French films